Rob Compas (born 10 November 1966) is a retired road bicycle racer from the Netherlands, who won the Dutch title for amateurs (road race) in 1992, defeating Erik Dekker (second) and Bart Voskamp (third). He represented his native country at the 1992 Summer Olympics in Barcelona, Spain, where he finished in 42nd position.

See also
 List of Dutch Olympic cyclists

References

External links
  Wielersite Profile

1966 births
Living people
Dutch male cyclists
Cyclists at the 1992 Summer Olympics
Olympic cyclists of the Netherlands
People from Venhuizen
Cyclists from North Holland